Yuliya Aleksandrovna Liteykina (née Nemaya; born 30 December 1977 in Khabarovsk, Russian SFSR) is a Russian speed skater who specialises in sprint.

Personal records

References

Profile

1977 births
Russian female speed skaters
Speed skaters at the 2006 Winter Olympics
Speed skaters at the 2010 Winter Olympics
Olympic speed skaters of Russia
Sportspeople from Khabarovsk
Living people